This is a list of Swedish television related events from 1984.

Events
5 May - Sweden wins the 29th Eurovision Song Contest in Luxembourg, Luxembourg. The winning song is "Diggi-Loo Diggi-Ley", performed by Herreys.
9 July – Miss Sweden 1984 Yvonne Riding is crowned as Miss Universe in Miami, USA, in the XXXIII edition.

Television shows
1–24 December - Julstrul med Staffan & Bengt

Ending this year

Births

Deaths

See also
1984 in Sweden

References